The Biet (1,965 m) is a mountain of the Schwyzer Alps, located east of Oberiberg in the canton of Schwyz. It lies on the range north of the Druesberg.

See also
List of mountains of Switzerland

References

External links
Biet on Hikr

Mountains of the Alps
Mountains of the canton of Schwyz
Mountains of Switzerland